Thomas M. Doerflinger (1952–2015) was an American historian.

Life
He is the son of William Main Doerflinger.
He was a MCEAS Dissertation Fellow, at Harvard University in 1978-1979.

He trained as a historian at Princeton and Harvard.

He died on August 23, 2015.

Awards
 1987 Bancroft Prize
 1980 Bowdoin Prize for Graduate Essays

Works
"How to Succeed in Business: An Exchange", The New York Review of Books, July 11, 1996
"Rural Capitalism in Iron Country: Staffing a Forest Factory, 1808–1815", William & Mary Quarterly, January 2002
"The Antilles Trade of the Old Regime: A Statistical Overview", Journal of Interdisciplinary History, Winter 1976

References

21st-century American historians
American male non-fiction writers
Historians of the American Revolution
1952 births
Princeton University alumni
Harvard Graduate School of Arts and Sciences alumni
2015 deaths
Bancroft Prize winners
21st-century American male writers